The Urban Monkey with Murray Foote is an Australian television comedy series on the Australian Broadcasting Corporation starring Sam Simmons and Janis McGavin as Lee-Anne.

The program premiered on 14 September 2009 on ABC2 at 8:55pm and then repeated on ABC1 from 2 October 2009 at 11:10pm. Episodes are five minutes long.

The series is presented in mockumentary style and draws parallels between human and animal worlds. The character Murray Foote is an animal warrior, conservationist, scientist, recording artist, good bloke, and ladies man. The promotional blurb states that the series was created in 1987, then lost, and then rediscovered recently in a garage in suburban Melbourne.

See also
 Good bloke
 List of Australian television series
 List of Australian Broadcasting Corporation programs

External links
 The Urban Monkey with Murray Foote on ABC's Website

References

Australian comedy television series
2009 Australian television series debuts
2009 Australian television series endings
Australian Broadcasting Corporation original programming